Martina Chrapánová (born 14 December 1989) is a former Slovak biathlete.

Career
Her best World Cup finish was 37th in a 10 km sprint event in Hochfilzen in 2012.

Chrapánová retired from biathlon after the end of the 2015–16 season.

References

External links
 IBU profile

1989 births
Living people
Slovak female biathletes
Biathletes at the 2014 Winter Olympics
Olympic biathletes of Slovakia
People from Revúca
Sportspeople from the Banská Bystrica Region